The 2018 Somali First Division is the 45th season of top-tier football in Somalia. The season began on 22 January and ended on 11 May 2018.

Final standings

References

External links
Somali Football Federation

Football leagues in Somalia
Foo
Somalia